Deoxycorticosterone pivalate (DOCP), also known as desoxycorticosterone trimethyl acetate (DOC-TMA or DCT) and sold under the brand names Zycortal, Percorten V, and Percorten M, is a mineralocorticoid medication and a mineralocorticoid ester. It is formulated as a microcrystalline aqueous suspension, is administered by intramuscular injection at regular intervals, and has a prolonged duration of action. The medication is the C21 pivalate (trimethylacetate) ester of 11-deoxycorticosterone.

See also
 List of corticosteroid esters § Desoxycortone esters

References

Corticosteroid esters
Diketones
Mineralocorticoids
Pivalate esters
Pregnanes
Prodrugs
Progestogens
Veterinary drugs